Sabine Hazboun (Arabic: سابين حزبون ; born 1994) is a Palestinian swimmer. She was born in Bethlehem. She competed in the women's 50m freestyle at the 2012 Summer Olympics in London, finishing with a personal best time of 28.28 seconds. She also competed in 5 world swimming championships, 2 Asian Games, Youth Olympic Games, Arab Games and other international championships. She trained in Barcelona.

References

1994 births
Living people
People from Bethlehem
Palestinian female swimmers
Olympic swimmers of Palestine
Swimmers at the 2012 Summer Olympics
Swimmers at the 2010 Summer Youth Olympics
Swimmers at the 2010 Asian Games
Swimmers at the 2014 Asian Games
Asian Games competitors for Palestine